Stephen Porter may refer to:
 Stephen Porter (director) (1925–2013), American stage and television director, producer, set designer, and writer
 Stephen Porter (general) (born c. 1962), Australian Army general, commander of the 2nd Division
 Stephen Porter (professor), professor of oral medicine at the Eastman Dental Institute of University College London
 Stephen G. Porter (1869–1930), Republican member of the U.S. House of Representatives from Pennsylvania
 Steve Porter (singer) (1864–1946), American pioneer recording artist
 Steve Porter (producer) (born c. 1978), American house music DJ and producer
 Steve Porter (wheelchair rugby) (born 1969), Australian Paralympic wheelchair rugby union player
 Steve Porter (American football), List of Indiana Hoosiers in the NFL Draft 1972
 Steven Porter (Canadian politician) (born 1945), member of the Legislative Assembly of New Brunswick
 Stephen C. Porter (1934–2015), professor of geological sciences and director of the Quaternary Research Center, University of Washington